Robin and Lorenzo Etherington are British comic, book and film creators who work together as The Etherington Brothers. They are the creators of the world's most successful art book of all time on Kickstarter, and the UK's most successful book of any kind in the history of Kickstarter, How to Think when you draw Volume 4, published in March 2021. They have broken the record for the most funded artbook of all time on Kickstarter for three consecutive years; in 2019, 2020 and 2021. They created the free online series of tutorials How to Think when you Draw (January 2017 onwards) and How to Think When You Write (January 2018 onwards). Their early works include Monkey Nuts, published as a collected edition by Random House in 2010, the "Baggage" graphic novel, also for Random House in 2011, and "Yore!" in The Dandy (2011). They created 5 book-length Long Gone Don adventures and eight book-length Von Doogan puzzle adventures for The Phoenix between 2012–2019. Their clients include studios such as Disney, DreamWorks, Aardman, and the BBC. They have worked on properties such as Star Wars, Transformers, Kung Fu Panda and How to Train Your Dragon.

References

External links
The Etherington Brothers' blog

British comics writers
British comics artists
The Dandy people
Sibling duos